The Petrel Base is a non-permanent Argentine scientific station located on Dundee Island, in the Joinville Group, in Graham Land, part of the Argentinian claim on Antarctica.

History 
Opened as a permanent base on 22 February 1967, it is being used as a temporary base since 1978.

See also
 Argentine Antarctica
 List of Antarctic research stations
 List of Antarctic field camps
 List of airports in Antarctica

References

External links
 Fundación Marambio – Base Petrel 

Argentine Antarctica
Joinville Island group
Outposts of Graham Land
1967 establishments in Antarctica